Teleboas (Τηλεβόας) may refer to:

 Teleboas (mythology), One of several figures in Greek mythology
 The Karasu (Euphrates), a river in eastern Turkey, called the Teleboas in ancient Greek

See also

 Teleboans or Teleboides, an ancient tribe in Acarnania, northwest Greece